Unbroken may refer to:

Books and film
 Unbroken (book), a 2010 nonfiction book by Laura Hillenbrand about World War II hero Louis Zamperini
 Unbroken (film), a 2014 film based on the Hillenbrand book
 Unbroken: Path to Redemption, a 2018 sequel to the 2014 film.

Music 
Unbroken (band), an American hardcore punk band

Albums 
Unbroken (Buddy Tate album), 1970
Unbroken (Demi Lovato album), 2011
Unbroken (D-Side album), 2006
Unbroken (Fiona album), 2011
Unbroken (Julie Elias album), 2015
Unbroken (Katharine McPhee album), 2010
Unbroken (A Perfect Murder album), 2004
Unbroken (Shannon Noll album), 2018
Unbroken,  a 2020 album by Crematory

Songs 
"Unbroken" (Bonnie Anderson song), 2015
"Unbroken" (Tim McGraw song), 2002
"Unbroken" (María Ólafsdóttir song), 2015
"Unbroken" (Stan Walker song), 2010
"Unbroken", by Black Veil Brides from Avengers Assemble: Music from and Inspired by the Motion Picture
"Unbroken", by Killswitch Engage from As Daylight Dies
"Unbroken", by Demi Lovato from Unbroken
"Unbroken", by The Stranglers from Suite XVI
"The Unbroken", by Lovebites from Electric Pentagram

Other uses 
 , a Royal Navy U-class submarine
 Unbroken (horse), a horse that has never been ridden